Gary Duff (born 14 February 1967) is a Northern Irish sports shooter who has represented both the Republic of Ireland and Great Britain in international competition. He competed in the men's 50 metre rifle prone event at the 1996 Summer Olympics.

References

External links
 

1967 births
Living people
Irish male sport shooters
Olympic shooters of Ireland
Shooters at the 1996 Summer Olympics
Place of birth missing (living people)